Karen Read (born 31 August 1959) is an Australian former cricketer who played as a right-handed batter. She appeared in three Test matches and 20 One Day Internationals for Australia. She played domestic cricket for Western Australia.

Read was a member of the Australian team that won the 1982 Women's Cricket World Cup.

References

External links
 
 
 Karen Read at southernstars.org.au

Living people
1959 births
Cricketers from Fremantle
Australia women Test cricketers
Australia women One Day International cricketers
Western Australia women cricketers